Jordan Cornell Williams (born March 23, 1993) is an American football outside linebacker for the DC Defenders. He played his senior season of high school football at Gainesville High School in Gainesville, Florida. He played college football at Tennessee for four years. Williams played in 44 games, of which he started 21, during his college career, recording 66 tackles and 6.5 sacks. After going undrafted in the 2015 NFL Draft, he signed with the New York Jets and spent time on the team's practice squad before being released in September 2015. He was then signed by the Miami Dolphins, where he spent time on both the practice squad and active roster, before being released in September 2016. He was then signed to the Giants' practice squad in December 2016.

Early years
Williams played his first three  years of high school football at P. K. Yonge Developmental Research School in Gainesville, Florida. During his junior year, he broke his collarbone in the fifth game and missed the rest of the season. While at P. K. Yonge, he spent time at middle linebacker, nose tackle and tight end.

After his junior year at P. K. Yonge, he transferred to play his senior year of football at Gainesville High School in Gainesville. In Williams' senior season in 2010, he played defensive end and tight end while also spending some time at long snapper. In 2010, he was named to both the Super 11 team and Class 5A-AA First-team of the Gainesville Sun. Gainesville High finished with an 11–2 record and advanced to the state semifinals. He played in the Florida Athletic Coaches Association (FACA)/Reebok North-South All Star Football Classic on December 22, 2010. He played at Gainesville High with future Tennessee teammate Trevarris Saulsberry.

In the class of 2011, Williams was rated a three-star recruit by Rivals.com, Scout.com, ESPN.com and 247Sports.com. He was also rated the No. 42 strongside defensive end in the country by Rivals.com, the No. 45 defensive end in the country by Scout.com, the No. 61 defensive end in the country by ESPN.com, and the No. 34 strongside defensive end in the country by 247Sports.com. He was also rated both a three-star recruit and the No. 40 strongside defensive end in the country on 247Sports.com's composite rating, which takes into account the ratings of all the other major recruiting services in the country.

He committed to play college football for Tennessee in October 2010. He also received offers from other schools, some of which included Arkansas, NC State, Oregon, South Florida, Vanderbilt, Syracuse, Maryland, Duke, Louisville, Iowa State, Troy, UCF, Michigan State and Marshall.

College career
Williams played for the Tennessee Volunteers of the University of Tennessee from 2011 to 2014 under head coaches Derek Dooley and Butch Jones. He majored in Arts & Sciences at Tennessee. He was a recipient of the Horne Athletic Scholarship.

He played in nine games his freshman year in 2011 as a defensive end, recording four tackles and a sack.

He was moved to jack linebacker his sophomore season in 2012. Williams appeared in ten games, of which he started in half of them, and totaled two sacks and 17 tackles, four of which were tackles for loss. In April 2012, he was one of four recipients of the team's John Stucky Award, which is given to the "player who shows the most dedication and work discipline to improve strength as selected by the strength and conditioning staff."

Williams was shifted back to defensive end for 2013 and played in 12 games, with three starts. He recorded 1.5 sacks and 18 tackles, 1.5 of which were tackles for loss. He was named to the 2013 Fall SEC Academic Honor Roll.

He moved to defensive tackle his senior year in 2014. He played in 13 games, all starts,  and totaled two sacks, four pass breakups and 27 tackles, four of which were tackles for loss. He was named to the 2014 Fall SEC Academic Honor Roll. He played in the 2015 Medal of Honor Bowl as part of the National Team.

Throughout his college career, Williams played in 44 games and started 21 of them. He recorded career totals of 6.5 sacks and 66 tackles, 10.5 of which were tackles for loss.

Professional career

Williams was rated the 54th best defensive end in the 2015 NFL Draft by NFLDraftScout.com.

New York Jets
Williams signed with the New York Jets in May 2015 after going undrafted in the 2015 NFL Draft. He was released by the Jets on September 5 and signed to the team's practice squad the following day. He was released by the Jets on September 22, 2015.

Miami Dolphins
Williams was signed to the Miami Dolphins' practice squad on October 6, 2015. He was promoted to the active roster on December 5. He made his NFL debut and only appearance of the 2015 season on December 6 against the Baltimore Ravens. He was released by the Dolphins on December 26 and signed to the team's practice squad three days later. He signed a reserve/future contract with the Dolphins in January 2016. He was released by the team on September 3 and signed to the Dolphins' practice squad the next day. He was released by the Dolphins on September 20, 2016.

New York Giants
On December 6, 2016, the New York Giants signed Williams to their practice squad. He signed a reserve/future contract with the Giants on January 9, 2017. On September 2, 2017, he was waived by the Giants and was signed to the practice squad the next day. He was promoted to the active roster on November 1. He was waived by the Giants on November 7, 2017, and was re-signed to the practice squad. He signed a reserve/future contract with the Giants on January 1, 2018.

On September 1, 2018, Williams was waived/injured by the Giants and was placed on injured reserve.

Tennessee Titans
On August 1, 2019, Williams signed with the Tennessee Titans. He was waived/injured on August 12, 2019 and was placed on injured reserve. His contract was terminated on July 28, 2020.

Personal  life
Williams' father, Keith, was a defensive lineman at Florida in the mid-1980s, was drafted by the Minnesota Vikings in the 12th round of the 1987 NFL Draft, and later played for the Chicago Bruisers, Dallas Texans and Orlando Predators of the Arena Football League from 1988 to 1991. Williams's sister, Janine, played volleyball at Florida and UCF. He held the first annual Jordan Williams Skills Camp on July 14, 2016.

References

External links
College stats

Living people
1993 births
Players of American football from Gainesville, Florida
American football defensive ends
American football linebackers
American football defensive tackles
African-American players of American football
Tennessee Volunteers football players
New York Jets players
Miami Dolphins players
New York Giants players
Tennessee Titans players
21st-century African-American sportspeople